The 2019 Qatar motorcycle Grand Prix was the first round of the 2019 MotoGP season. It was held at the Losail International Circuit in Doha on 10 March 2019.

Summary
The race saw the introduction of a new engine package in the Moto2 class to replace the Honda CBR600RR inline-4 engine which was used since Moto2 replaced 250cc 2-strokes in 2010. The new engines in the intermediate class are 765cc (46.7 cu in) triple engines made by Triumph Motorcycles, and are based on the engine of the Triumph Street Triple RS 765.

The weekend also marked the début of a new penalty named the "Long Lap" penalty for riders exceeding track limits. This is a route which is marked at a safe place on every circuit (usually an asphalt or run-off area outside a corner). Any rider that receives the penalty is given 3 laps to ride through it.

MV Agusta also made a return to Grand Prix racing after an absence of 42 years, joining forces with the Forward Racing team.

The Moto2 and Moto3 classes also adopted the qualifying format used by MotoGP since 2013, in which the riders that finish in 15th place or below in the third free practice session go to qualifying 1, then the four fastest riders go through to join the remaining 14 in qualifying 2.

In the Moto3 race, Arón Canet took pole position, with the race win going to Honda Team Asia's Kaito Toba, who became the first Japanese rider to win in the Moto3 class. Romano Fenati also made his return to Grand Prix racing after he had his contract with Forward Racing in Moto2 terminated after the controversial incident with Stefano Manzi.

In the first Triumph-powered Moto2 race, Marcel Schrötter took the first pole position of his career, joined on the front row by Xavi Vierge and Lorenzo Baldassarri. Vierge led the race throughout the early stages, but then began to drop back to 10th place. Baldassarri took the win, ahead of Thomas Lüthi on his Moto2 return and Schrötter. Lüthi also set the fastest lap.

In the MotoGP race, Maverick Viñales took pole for the newly-rebranded Monster Energy Yamaha team in his first race with the number 12. Rookie Fabio Quartararo also impressed in qualifying, taking 5th place, riding the for the new Petronas Yamaha satellite team, replacing Tech 3 who switched bikes to KTM after 18 years with Yamaha. However, on the warm-up lap, Quartararo had an issue with his bike and had to start from the pitlane. At the start, Viñales made a bad start and dropped to 7th, behind Suzuki rookie Joan Mir. Despite his problems at the start, Quartararo set the fastest lap on the third lap. In the closing stages, Andrea Dovizioso and reigning champion Marc Márquez fought for the victory, with the Ducati rider taking the victory for the second consecutive season. Cal Crutchlow completed the podium on his return after missing the final two races of 2018 due to injury. Jorge Lorenzo finished 13th on his first outing for Repsol Honda after only qualifying in 15th.

Classification

MotoGP

Moto2

Moto3

Championship standings after the race

MotoGP

Moto2

Moto3

References

External links

Qatar
Motorcycle Grand Prix
Qatar motorcycle Grand Prix
Qatar motorcycle Grand Prix